The 1970–71 BBC2 Floodlit Trophy was the sixth occasion on which the BBC2 Floodlit Trophy competition had been held.
This year was another new name on the  trophy -  and ALSO St. Helens' third time in six years as runner-up
Leeds won the trophy by beating St. Helens by the score of 9-5
The match was played at Headingley, Leeds, now in West Yorkshire. The attendance was 7,612 and receipts were £2,189

Background 
This season saw no changes in the  entrants, no new members and no withdrawals, the number remaining at eighteen.
The format was changed slightly removing the  two-legged home and away ties from the preliminary round and playing the whole competition on a knock-out basis.
The preliminary round involved four clubs, to reduce the  numbers to sixteen.

Competition and results

Preliminary round 
Involved  2 matches and 4 clubs

Round 1 – first round 
Involved  8 matches and 16 clubs

Round 2 – quarter finals 
Involved 4 matches with 8 clubs

Round 3 – semi-finals  
Involved 2 matches and 4 clubs

Round 3 – Semi-finals – replays  
Involved 1 match and 2 clubs

Final

Teams and scorers 

Scoring - Try = three (3) points - Goal = two (2) points - Drop goal = two (2) points

The road to success 
This tree excludes any preliminary round fixtures

Notes and comments 
1 * This match was televised
2  * Headingley, Leeds, is the home ground of Leeds RLFC with a capacity of 21,000. The record attendance was  40,175 for a league match between Leeds and Bradford Northern on 21 May 1947.

General information for those unfamiliar 
The Rugby League BBC2 Floodlit Trophy was a knock-out competition sponsored by the BBC and between rugby league clubs, entrance to which was conditional upon the club having floodlights. Most matches were played on an evening, and those of which the second half was televised, were played on a Tuesday evening.
Despite the competition being named as 'Floodlit', many matches took place during the afternoons and not under floodlights, and several of the entrants, including  Barrow and Bramley did not have adequate lighting. And, when in 1973, due to the world oil crisis, the government restricted the use of floodlights in sport, all the matches, including the Trophy final, had to be played in the afternoon rather than at night.
The Rugby League season always (until the onset of "Summer Rugby" in 1996) ran from around August-time through to around May-time and this competition always took place early in the season, in the Autumn, with the final taking place in December (The only exception to this was when disruption of the fixture list was caused by inclement weather)

See also 
1970–71 Northern Rugby Football League season
1970 Lancashire Cup
1970 Yorkshire Cup
BBC2 Floodlit Trophy
Rugby league county cups

References

External links
Saints Heritage Society
1896–97 Northern Rugby Football Union season at wigan.rlfans.com
Hull&Proud Fixtures & Results 1896/1897
Widnes Vikings - One team, one passion Season In Review - 1896-97
The Northern Union at warringtonwolves.org
Huddersfield R L Heritage

BBC2 Floodlit Trophy
BBC2 Floodlit Trophy